Hellinsia cyrtoacanthaus is a moth of the family Pterophoridae that is endemic to Korea.

References

cyrtoacanthaus
Moths described in 2009
Moths of Asia
Insects of Korea